Arcadi Oliveres i Boadella (27 November 1945 – 6 April 2021) was a Spanish economist, academic, and social activist. He was president of "Justícia i Pau", a Christian peace group in Catalonia, and helped to promote its war tax resistance campaign.

References

Spanish economists
1945 births
2021 deaths
Tax resisters